Hua Wilfried Serge Koffi (born 12 October 1987) is an Ivorian athlete specializing in sprinting events. He won the bronze medal at the 2013 and the gold at the 2015 Summer Universiade in addition to multiple medals on the continental level.

Competition record

Personal bests
Outdoor
100 metres – 10.01 (+1.1) (Tempe, AZ 2016)
200 metres – 20.25 (+0.8) (Marrakech 2014)
Indoor
60 metres – 6.62 (Flagstaff 2016)
200 metres – 20.99 (Nanjing 2014)

References

External links

1987 births
Living people
Ivorian male sprinters
World Athletics Championships athletes for Ivory Coast
Athletes (track and field) at the 2016 Summer Olympics
Olympic athletes of Ivory Coast
African Games gold medalists for Ivory Coast
African Games medalists in athletics (track and field)
Universiade medalists in athletics (track and field)
African Games bronze medalists for Ivory Coast
Athletes (track and field) at the 2011 All-Africa Games
Universiade medalists for Ivory Coast
Competitors at the 2011 Summer Universiade
Medalists at the 2013 Summer Universiade
Medalists at the 2015 Summer Universiade